Gardsjönäs is a small 200-year-old village with a population of 9. The village is located within the Storuman Municipality, Västerbotten County, Sweden.

The sami name is Gardejaur, meaning Fence-lake-Headland (Gard-sjö-näs in Swedish).

The village is located on high ground near a large lake, the Gardsjönäs lake, making it a quite popular place during the Swedish winter holidays, tourist and hunting seasons. The locals enjoy a wildlife untouched by man without being too far away from more urban settlements. The village is easily reached thanks to the close proximity of European route E12.

Populated places in Västerbotten County